The 19th New York Cavalry Regiment was a cavalry regiment that served in the Union Army during the American Civil War.

Service
Originally mustered into service as the 130th New York Volunteer Infantry Regiment it was converted to cavalry on July 28, 1863, and designated as the 19th Regiment New York Volunteer Cavalry. The men were recruited from Allegany, Livingston, and Wyoming counties. The 19th Cavalry was officially re-designated as the 1st Regiment New York Dragoons on September 10, 1863.  The regiment was commanded by Col. Alfred Gibbs.

See also
List of New York Civil War regiments

Notes

References
The Civil War Archive
New York State Military Museum and Veterans Research Center - Civil War – 1st Dragoons Regiment

Cavalry 019
1863 establishments in New York (state)
Military units and formations established in 1863
Military units and formations disestablished in 1863